Álvaro Teherán Teherán (January 6, 1966 – May 4, 2020) was a Colombian basketball player who was selected with the 44th overall pick in the 1991 NBA Draft by the Philadelphia 76ers.  A 7'1" center, Teherán played college basketball at Houston Baptist from 1987–89 and Houston from 1989-91.

Born in María La Baja, Colombia, Teherán was the son of Romualdo Teherán and Cecilia Teherán (not related). He was noticed playing basketball by Alfonso Torres in 1984, who recommended that he moved to Cartagena, Colombia.

He died on May 4, 2020, having been hospitalized with kidney failure in December 2019.

His son, Jaret Valencia, is a high school basketball prospect playing at Veritas Prep in Calabasas, California.

References

External links 
 Career NCAA stats at The Draft Review
 Profile at ACB (Spanish League) webpage

1966 births
2020 deaths
Baloncesto Fuenlabrada players
Baloncesto Málaga players
Centers (basketball)
Colombian expatriate basketball people in Spain
Colombian expatriate basketball people in the United States
Colombian men's basketball players
Fort Wayne Fury players
Houston Christian Huskies men's basketball players
Houston Cougars men's basketball players
KK Olimpija players
Liga ACB players
Philadelphia 76ers draft picks
Sportspeople from Cartagena, Colombia
Colombian people of African descent